Souad Nechab (born 25 December 1979) is an Algerian table tennis player. She competed in the women's doubles event at the 2004 Summer Olympics.

References

External links
 

1979 births
Living people
Algerian female table tennis players
Olympic table tennis players of Algeria
Table tennis players at the 2004 Summer Olympics
Place of birth missing (living people)
21st-century Algerian people